Pauline Betz Addie (née Pauline May Betz, August 6, 1919 – May 31, 2011) was an American professional tennis player. She won five Grand Slam singles titles and was the runner-up on three other occasions. Jack Kramer called her the second best female tennis player he ever saw, behind Helen Wills Moody.

Early life
Betz attended Los Angeles High School and learned her tennis from Dick Skeen. She continued her tennis and education at Rollins College (graduating in 1943), where she was a member of Kappa Alpha Theta sorority. Betz earned an MA in economics from Columbia University.

Career

Amateur
Betz won the first of her four singles titles at the U.S. Championships in 1942, saving a match point in the semifinals against Margaret Osborne while trailing 3–5 in the final set.  The following year, she won the Tri-State tournament in Cincinnati, Ohio, defeating Catherine Wolf in the final without losing a point in the first set, a "golden set". She won the Wimbledon singles title in 1946, the only time she entered the tournament, without losing a set. At the 1946 French Championships, held that year after Wimbledon, she lost the final in three sets to Margaret Osborne after failing to convert two match points.

According to John Olliff, Betz was ranked world no. 1 in 1946 (no rankings issued from 1940 through 1945). She was included in the year-end top 10 rankings issued by the United States Lawn Tennis Association from 1939 through 1946. She was the top ranked U.S. player from 1942 through 1944 and in 1946. Her other career singles highlights include winning the Dixie International Championships three times (1940–1942).

Professional
Her amateur career ended in 1947 when the USLTA revoked her amateur status for exploring the possibilities of turning professional. Betz played two professional tours of matches against Sarah Palfrey Cooke (1947) and Gussie Moran (1951). A professional tour against Maureen Connolly was planned for 1955, but did not materialize due to Connolly's career-ending injury.

Pauline Betz won the Cleveland Women's World Professional Championships in 1953, 1955, and 1956, defeating Doris Hart, the reigning U.S. champion, in the 1956 final. In May 1956, she also played another match against Hart at Milwaukee, winning in two straight sets.

Death
Betz died of complications linked to her contraction of Parkinson's disease on May 31, 2011. She is buried with her husband Bob Addie in a double plot in St Gabriel Cemetery in Potomac, Maryland

Awards and honors
On September 2, 1946, Betz appeared on the cover of TIME magazine.
Betz was inducted into the International Tennis Hall of Fame in 1965. In 1995, she was inducted in the ITA Women's Collegiate Tennis Hall of Fame. The Pauline Betz Addie Tennis Center at Cabin John Regional Park in Potomac, Maryland, was renamed in her honor on May 1, 2008. Addie, Albert Ritzenberg, and Stanly Hoffberger founded the center in 1972.

Grand Slam finals

Singles (5 titles, 3 runners-up)

Doubles: 7 (7 runner-ups)

Mixed Doubles: 3 (1 title, 2 runner-ups)

Grand Slam singles tournament timeline

R = tournament restricted to French nationals and held under German occupation.

1In 1946, the French Championships were held after Wimbledon.

Personal life
In 1949, Betz published an autobiography titled Wings on my Tennis Shoes. That same year she married Bob Addie, born Addonizio, a sportswriter for the Washington Times-Herald and Washington Post. The couple had five children, including poet and novelist Kim Addonizio, Rusty, Gary, Jon and Rick. Her granddaughter Aya Cash is an actress. Betz died in her sleep on May 31, 2011, aged 91.

Records

See also
 Performance timelines for all female tennis players who reached at least one Grand Slam final

References

External links 
 
 

1919 births
2011 deaths
American female tennis players
French Championships (tennis) champions
International Tennis Hall of Fame inductees
Sportspeople from Dayton, Ohio
Tennis players from Los Angeles
Rollins Tars women's tennis players
Tennis people from Ohio
United States National champions (tennis)
Wimbledon champions (pre-Open Era)
Grand Slam (tennis) champions in women's singles
Grand Slam (tennis) champions in mixed doubles
Professional tennis players before the Open Era
World number 1 ranked female tennis players
Rollins College alumni
Columbia Graduate School of Arts and Sciences alumni